Q5 may refer to:

 Q (TV series), a Spike Milligan BBC series that was known during its first series as "Q5"
 Q5 (band), an American heavy metal group
 BlackBerry Q5
 Quran 5, the 5th chapter of the Islamic Holy book

Transport
 Audi Q5, a compact luxury crossover SUV
 Q5 (New York City bus)
 LNER Class Q5, a class of British 0-8-0 steam locomotives (previously known as NER Classes T & T1)

Military
 Nanchang Q-5 ground attack aircraft
 HMS Farnborough, also known as Q5, was a Q-ship of the First World War
 Q-5 is an alternate designation for the AQM-60 Kingfisher

See also
5Q